Jelka Godec Schmidt (born 1 May 1958) is a Slovene illustrator and writer of children's books.

Godec was born in Ljubljana in 1958. She graduated from the Academy of Fine Arts in Ljubljana and has since worked as a free-lance artist. She has illustrated over 40 books and her illustrations also appear in magazines for children. Her mother Ančka Gošnik Godec is also an illustrator, as was her husband Matjaž Schmidt.

She won the Levstik Award in 1997 for her illustrations of Bisernica: slovenske kratke pripovedi za otroke (Bisernica: Traditional Short Stories for Children).

Selected illustrated works

 Zgodba o volku in lisici (The Tale of the Wolf and the Fox), written by Mojiceja Podgoršek, 2009
 Najlepše pravljice 2 (Most Beautiful Fairy Tales 2), 2009
 Zobek Mlečko pri zobozdravniku (Milky the Tooth at the Dentist's), written by Helena Koncut Kraljič, 2009
 O štirih prijatejih (About Four Friends), written by Mojiceja Podgoršek, 2009
 Janko in Metka in druge pravljice (Hansel and Gretel and Other Fairy Tales), written by Brothers Grimm, 2009
 Mizica, pogrni se in druge pravljice (The Wishing-Table and Other Tales), written by Brothers Grimm, 2009
 Mavrične kraljične (The Rainbow Princesses), written by Helena Koncut Kraljič, 2007
 Škrat Zguba in kameleon 3 (Goblin Looser and Cameleon 3), author and illustrator, 2006
 Najdihojca, written by Fran Levstik, 2005

References

Slovenian children's book illustrators
Living people
1958 births
Artists from Ljubljana
Levstik Award laureates
University of Ljubljana alumni
Slovenian women artists
Slovenian women illustrators